The Puerta de Atocha was a gate in the city walls of Madrid (known as the Walls of Philip IV). It owed its name to be located in the vicinity of the old hermitage, later Convento de Nuestra Señora de Atocha. It was demolished in 1850. Its location must exit to

Background
It was added as part of the Walls of Philip IV in 1748, substituting the previous .

The gate was demolished in 1850 to begin works on the Atocha railway station in 1992,  was given to the station the name of Puerta de Atocha to the new terminal of Alta Velocidad Española in honor of the missing gate.

References

External links

Neoclassical architecture in Spain
Demolished buildings and structures in Madrid
Infrastructure completed in 1769
Former gates
City gates in Spain
Buildings and structures demolished in 1850